Ifasya is an extinct genus of prawn. It contains the species Ifasya madagascariensis and Ifasya straelini, and was named in 1995 by Alessandro Garassino and Giorgio Teruzzi. It existed in Madagascar during the Lower Triassic period.

References

Penaeidae
Triassic crustaceans
Prehistoric animals of Madagascar
Fossil taxa described in 1995